Jason Gerhardt (born April 21, 1974) is an American actor. He is known for playing the role of Cooper Barrett in General Hospital and Zack Kilmer in Mistresses.

References

External links
 

1974 births
Living people
21st-century American male actors
American male film actors
American male television actors
People from Austin, Minnesota
Male actors from Minnesota